Behind the Lines is a 1916 American silent drama film featuring Harry Carey. Behind the Lines was produced by Bluebird Photoplays, one of the three brands of motion pictures then being released by Universal Film Manufacturing Company.

Cast
 Edith Johnson as Nina Garcia
 Harry Carey as Dr. Ralph Hamlin
 Ruth Clifford as Camilla
 Mark Fenton as Señor Garcia (as Marc Fenton)
 Miriam Shelby as Señnora Cano
 William Human as Carlos (as Bill Human)
 Lee Shumway as Jose (as L.C. Shumway)
 Edwin Wallock as General Dominguez (as E.N. Wallack)
 L. M. Wells as General Nomonza
 Ray Hanford as Torrenti
 Lee Hill as Fred Williams
 Ernest Shields as Bit Role (uncredited)

See also
 List of American films of 1916
 Harry Carey filmography

References

External links

1916 films
1916 drama films
Silent American drama films
American silent feature films
American black-and-white films
Films directed by Henry MacRae
Universal Pictures films
1910s American films